Raw Opium is a 2011 documentary film produced by Robert Lang of Kensington Communications, directed by Peter Findlay and written by Peter Findlay and Robert Lang.  The documentary examines the worldwide opium trade, and the vast criminal and public health issues that have arisen alongside.

Raw Opium is a journey around the world and through time, where conflicting forces do battle over the narcotic sap of the opium poppy. From an opium master in southeast Asia to a UN drug enforcement officer on the border of Afghanistan hunting down the smugglers of Central Asia; from a former Indian government Drug Czar and opium farmer to a crusading Vancouver doctor and Portuguese street worker who daily confront the realities of drug addiction.

Shown is the pivotal role that has been played by the opium poppy, not just in the lives of people who grow, manufacture and use it but also in the increasingly-tense sphere of international relations. In the process, assumptions about addiction and the War on Drugs are challenged.

People in the documentary

Christer Brannerud: Project lead, United Nations Office on Drugs and Crime (UNODC), Tajikistan

Dr. Gabor Maté: Physician, Author, Public Speaker, Vancouver, Canada

Peter Dale Scott: Author and Commentator, Berkeley, USA

Larry Mendosa: Special Agent, Drug Enforcement Administration, USA

Gwynne Dyer: Author, Historian, Journalist, London, UK

Misha Glenny: Journalist, Author, UK

Darwin Fisher: Intake manager, Insite, Vancouver, Canada

Derek Thomas: Client at Insite, Vancouver, Canada

Eugene Oscapella: Barrister and Solicitor, Ottawa, Canada

Pam Squire, MD.: Doctor, Pain Management Specialist, Vancouver, Canada

Daniel Reid: Author and Historian, Australia

Peresia and Danglesia Kathak: Opium farmers, Arunachal Pradesh, India

Romesh Bhattacharji: Former Narcotics Commissioner, India

Rui Reis: Outreach worker, Institute on Drugs and Drug Addiction, Lisbon, Portugal

Broadcasts
The film was adapted into a 2-part TV documentary, which has been shown in several countries:

 2-part documentary, broadcast, online streamed with a live chat, TVO, Ontario, Canada
 2-part documentary, broadcast on CTV Two, Alberta, Canada
 Feature French version broadcast on Canal D throughout French Canada
 2-part documentary broadcast on SBS TV, Australia
 Feature documentary broadcast in Germany, France, Switzerland on ZDF and Arte

References

External links
 
 

Canadian documentary films
Documentary films about the illegal drug trade
2011 films
2011 documentary films
2010s English-language films
2010s Canadian films